Jeptha Knob is the highest point in the Bluegrass region of Kentucky. It is located on private property in Shelby County, Kentucky, about eight miles east of Shelbyville near the hamlet of Clay Village and rises some 300 ft (90 m) higher than the surrounding rolling farmland.

Geography
The knob is located almost exactly midway between Lexington and Louisville and is the symbolic dividing point between both cities' hinterlands. There are four points in the area that contend for the highest point. The location and elevation given here is that of a National Geodetic Survey benchmark.

Impact structure
The Kentucky historical marker at its base calls it a "cryptovolcanic structure", but it is now believed to be the result of an asteroid impact some 425 million years ago.  Iridium apparently has been found in anomalously high levels in breccias associated with the structure.

See also
 Knobs region
 Middlesboro crater

References

External links
 
 

Landforms of Shelby County, Kentucky
Possible impact craters on Earth
Hills of Kentucky